Away from Home (Tnic Heru) is an Armenian entertainment television program. The series premiered on ATV Armenia on 10 November 2015. It is a travel show about costumes, history, geography, national traditions and lifestyles of different nations  featuring both the richest and poorest areas in the world. It is hosted by Vardan Sargsyan.

Countries and regions that the program has visited

Season 1
 India (13 episodes)
 Egypt (6 episodes)
 General – 19 episodes

Season 2
 Vietnam (10 episodes)
 Maldives (5 episodes)
 Adjara (4 episodes)
 Malaysia (unknown episodes)
 Sri Lanka (unknown episodes)
 Thailand (unknown episodes)

References

External links

 
 Away from Home on YouTube
 New Season of Away from Home on YouTube

Armenian-language television shows
Nonlinear narrative television series
ATV (Armenia) original programming